William VerMeulen is an American horn player and horn professor. He has been Principal Horn of the Houston Symphony Orchestra since 1990. He is also Professor of Horn at the Shepherd School of Music at Rice University in Houston, Texas.  In addition, he is Brass Artist-in-Residence at the Glenn Gould School of Music in Toronto and Visiting Professor of Horn at the Eastman School of Music. Before joining the HSO, he was a member of the Columbus Symphony, Honolulu Symphony, and Kansas City Philharmonic. In addition, he maintains an active solo and chamber music career with appearances at Music@Menlo and the Chamber Music Society of Lincoln Center.

Early life
VerMeulen was born on January 3, 1961, in Lake Forest, Illinois, to a veterinarian father and a semi-professional cellist mother. He sang in church choir and was enrolled in piano lessons from a young age. After completing several piano recitals, he began to play horn. VerMeulen attended the Interlochen Arts Academy before being accepted as a student of Dale Clevenger at Northwestern University.

Professional life
At the age of 18, within two months of becoming the first freshman student at Northwestern University of Chicago Symphony Principal horn, Dale Clevenger, William VerMeulen was employed as an extra horn with the Chicago Symphony. Three months later, VerMeulen won his first professional orchestral audition as Second Horn of the Kansas City Philharmonic. Almost immediately after his arrival, the orchestra went on strike and ceased to play concerts. During the strike VerMeulen performed with the Jack Daniels Original Silver Cornet Band and spent 4 months as an acting Principal Horn of the St. Paul Chamber Orchestra. He was also offered Principal positions at the La Scala Opera and Hamburg State Philharmonic orchestras, which he declined to accept. Shortly after returning to Kansas City when the strike was resolved he won the Principal Horn position of the Honolulu Symphony Orchestra, a title he held for 8 seasons. VerMeulen then won Principal Horn in the Columbus Symphony and shortly thereafter was hired by Christoph Eschenbach and the Houston Symphony as Principal Horn.

VerMeulen was the second American Hornist to record the complete Mozart Horn Concertos with a major American Orchestra. The album was recorded at with Christoph Eschenbach and the Houston Symphony in 1993. In addition, he was featured on Cantos, a CD of works by American composer Samuel Adler and a recording of the chamber version of Bruckner 7th symphony performing with Gruppo Montibello. In addition to the dozens of recording made as Principal Horn in an orchestra he has recorded the Brahms Trio opus 40, Mozart Quintet K. 407, Schoenberg Wind Quintet, Beethoven Septet opus 20, Spohr Nonet opus 31, and the Six Bagatelles for wind quintet by Ligeti for Music@Menlo. In addition, he is featured as first horn on a live recording of Bach Brandenbug Concerto no. 1 with the Chamber Music Society of Lincoln Center. He is also featured on the CD, "Texas Horns" which is a collaboration between the horn sections of the Houston and Dallas Symphony Orchestras. He also recorded an album of Christmas music, entitled, 'The Christmas Horn', collaborating with horn students from the Shepherd School of Music and VerMeulen's former teacher and mentor, Dale Clevenger. VerMeulen has had numerous compositions written for him, by composers including Samuel Adler, Pierre Jalbert, Anthony DiLorenzo, and the 'horn cantata' Canticum Sacrum, written by Robert J. Bradshaw. He also performed in the North American premier of Collage for four horns and orchestra by film composer James Horner. VerMeulen has performed as a concert soloist with the Auckland Philharmonia, Wroclaw Philharmonic in Poland, the Savannah Symphony, Toledo Symphony, Buffalo Philharmonic, Chicago Civic Orchestra, Lake Forest Symphony, Anchorage Symphony, Jalapa Symphony, Shepherd School Symphony Orchestra, Huntsville Symphony, Virginia Symphony, Kraków Chamber Orchestra, National Symphony of Mexico, National Philharmonic, Columbus Symphony, Sun Valley Summer Symphony, Honolulu Symphony and Houston Symphony.

VerMeulen has been invited to perform as Guest Principal Horn with the Chicago Symphony Orchestra, Los Angeles Philharmonic, Cincinnati Symphony, St. Louis Symphony, Pittsburgh Symphony and St. Paul Chamber Orchestra. In addition to his orchestral activities, VerMeulen has performed and taught at many music festivals, including the Aspen Music Festival, Banff Centre, Domaine Forget, National Youth Orchestra - USA, Tanglewood Music Festival, Grand Teton Music Festival, Santa Fe Chamber Music Festival, Pacific Music Festival, Seattle Chamber Music Festival, Orcas Island Chamber Music Festival, National Orchestral Institute, New World Symphony, National Youth Orchestra USA, National Repertory Orchestra, Colorado Music Festival, Interlochen Arts Academy, Interlochen Arts Camp, Methow Music Festival, Sarasota Music Festival and the Sun Valley Summer Symphony where he also serves as Principal Horn.

In 1985, he received the "Distinguished Teacher of America Certificate of Excellence" from President Ronald Reagan and the White House commission on Presidential Scholars. He was a member of the Advisory Council of the International Horn Society for nine years and serves an adjudicator and board member of the International Horn Competition of America. In 2009-10 he was an artist of the Chamber Music Society of Lincoln Center.

Personal life
William VerMeulen is married to violinist Sylvia VerMeulen. He has a son and a daughter.

Sources

 http://www.parkerartists.com/NewPages/vermeulen.html
 http://www.interlochen.org/high-performing-alumni#symphony

References

External links
 http://vermeulenmusic.com/
 http://williamvermeulen.com/

American classical horn players
Aspen Music Festival and School faculty
Texas classical music
Living people
1961 births
Rice University faculty
Bienen School of Music alumni